The 1938–39 Akron Firestone Non-Skids season was the Non-Skids' second year in the United States' National Basketball League (NBL), which was also the second year the league existed. Eight teams competed in the NBL, comprising four teams each in the Eastern and Western Divisions. The Non-Skids were one of two teams from Akron, Ohio in the league, the other being the Akron Goodyear Wingfoots.

The Non-Skids played their home games at Firestone Clubhouse. They finished the season with a league best 24–3 record and won the Eastern Division. They then went on to win the league's playoffs championship against the Western Division's Oshkosh All-Stars, three games to two in a best-of-five series.

Head coach Paul Sheeks won the league's Coach of the Year Award. Players Jerry Bush and Soup Cable earned First Team All-NBL honors, while John Moir and Jack Ozburn earned Second Team All-NBL honors.

Roster

Note: Paul Nowak and Don Smith were not on the playoffs roster.

Regular season

Season standings

Playoffs

NBL Championship
(E1) Akron Firestone Non-Skids vs. (W1) Oshkosh All-Stars: Akron wins series 3–2
Game 1 @ Akron: Akron 50, Oshkosh 38
Game 2 @ Akron: Oshkosh 38, Akron 36
Game 3 @ Oshkosh: Akron 40, Oshkosh 29
Game 4 @ Oshkosh: Oshkosh 49, Oshkosh 37
Game 5 @ Oshkosh: Akron 37, Oshkosh 30

Awards and honors
 NBL Coach of the Year – Paul Sheeks
 First Team All-NBL – Jerry Bush and Soup Cable
 Second Team All-NBL – John Moir and Jack Ozburn

References

Akron Firestone Non-Skids seasons
Akron Firestone
National Basketball League (United States) championship seasons
Akron Firestone Non-Skids
Akron Firestone Non-Skids